Keith Gledhill and Ellsworth Vines defeated the defending champions Jack Crawford and Gar Moon 6–4, 10–8, 6–2 in the final, to win the men's doubles tennis title at the 1933 Australian Championships.

Seeds

  Wilmer Allison /  John Van Ryn (semifinals)
  Keith Gledhill /  Ellsworth Vines (champions)
  Jack Crawford /  Gar Moon (final)
  Jack Clemenger /  Bob Schlesinger (quarterfinals)
  Adrian Quist /  Don Turnbull (quarterfinals)
  Jack Purcell /  Bert Tonkin (quarterfinals)

Draw

Draw

Notes

References

External links
   Sources for seedings

1933 in Australian tennis
Men's Doubles